Tobias Michael (13 June 1592, in Dresden – 26 June 1657, in Leipzig) was a German composer and cantor of the Thomasschule in Leipzig from 1631 until his death. He updated Johann Hermann Schein's Cantional in 1645. He was son of the Flemish Rogier Michael (1552–1619).

Works, editions and recordings
Little of his music has been preserved. 
 Ich bin gewiss, dass Weder Tod noch Leben on Geistliche Werke von Thomaskantoren Thomanerchor Leipzig, dir. Hans-Joachim Rotzsch Capriccio 1989
 settings of Psalm 116 in Angst der Hellen und Friede der Seelen by Tobias and his father

References

Thomaskantors
1592 births
1657 deaths